Wu Yanshu (born 1938) is a Chinese actress. Wu is considered a National Class-A Actor in China.

Wu first garnered recognition for her acting in 2016, when her performance in Finding Mr. Right 2 and earned her a Golden Horse Award nomination for Best Supporting Actress. Her film breakthrough came in 2017 with her performance as the grandmother in the drama film Love Education, for which she received Best Supporting Actress nominations at the 54th Golden Horse Awards, 37th Hong Kong Film Awards and 12th Asian Film Awards. For her role in Relocate, she won a Best Supporting Actress at the 31st Golden Rooster Awards, the Chinese equivalent of the Academy Awards.

Early life
Born in 1938, Wu worked at Shanxi Drama Theatre since the 1960s. Premier Zhou Enlai invited her to performed Liu Hulan in the Great Hall of the People in Beijing. She retired in 2003. In 2011 she moved to Beijing, living with her daughter.

Career
Wu's first major film credit was Stream Is Singing, playing the role of Gao Xiaoling. The drama film was produced by Changchun Film Studio.

In 1982, she guest-starred on Men of a Certain Age, a drama film starring Da Shichang and Pan Hong.

Wu had a supporting role in the comedy television series The Story of Xi Gengtian (2006), which starred Lin Yongjian as Xi Gengtian.

In 2011, Wu had a cameo appearance in Journey to the West, adapted from Wu Cheng'en's classical novel of Journey to the West, one of the Four Great Classical Novels in Chinese literature.

Wu appeared as Yu Lan in Love is Not Blind (2013), a romance drama starring Yao Di and Zhang Mo.

In 2016, Wu played the role of Tang Xiuyi in Xue Xiaolu's film Finding Mr. Right 2, for which she received a Best Supporting Actress nomination at the 53rd Golden Horse Awards.

Wu had key supporting role in the 2017 Love Education, directed by Sylvia Chang. She was praised for her role and earned critical acclaim for her performance. And she was nominated for Best Supporting Actress at the 54th Golden Horse Awards, 37th Hong Kong Film Awards and 12th Asian Film Awards.  At the same year, Wu's performance in the feature film Relocate which garnered her a Best Supporting Actress at the 31st Golden Rooster Awards.

Personal life
Wu's husband was a composer and chairman of Shanxi Provincial Musicians Association. Her daughter is a screenwriter.

Filmography

Film

TV series

Theater

Awards and nominations

References

External links
 
 
 Wu Yanshu on Douban 
 Wu Yanshi on Metime 

1938 births
Living people
Chinese film actresses
Chinese television actresses
21st-century Chinese actresses
20th-century Chinese actresses